Josef "Pepa, Pepi, Joe" Maleček  (18 June 1903 – 26 September 1982) was a very successful Czechoslovak ice hockey player during the period between World Wars.

He was born in Prague and died in Bayport, New York, United States. In 1924 he participated with the Czechoslovak team in the first Winter Olympics ice hockey tournament. Four years later he was a member of the Czechoslovak team which participated in the 1928 Olympics ice hockey tournament. In 1936 he finished fourth with the Czechoslovak team in the Olympic ice hockey tournament. After communist takeover in Czechoslovakia (1948) he emigrated from the country.

Maleček was also a tennis player, who competed in both the Wimbledon and French Championships in the early 1930s. Maleček also represented Czechoslovakia at the Davis Cup.

References

External links

1903 births
1982 deaths
Czechoslovak emigrants to the United States
Czechoslovak male tennis players
Ice hockey people from Prague
Ice hockey players at the 1924 Winter Olympics
Ice hockey players at the 1928 Winter Olympics
Ice hockey players at the 1936 Winter Olympics
IIHF Hall of Fame inductees
Olympic ice hockey players of Czechoslovakia
People from Bayport, New York
Czech male tennis players
Czech ice hockey centres
Czechoslovak ice hockey centres
Tennis players from Prague